Three-time defending champion Rafael Nadal successfully defended his title, defeating David Ferrer in the final 6–1, 4–6, 6–1, to win the singles title at the 2008 Barcelona Open. It was his record fourth title at the Barcelona Open.

Seeds
The top eight seeds receive a bye into the second round.

Draw

Finals

Top half

Section 1

Section 2

Bottom half

Section 3

Section 4

Qualifying

Qualifying seeds

Qualifiers

Lucky losers

Qualifying draw

First qualifier

Second qualifier

Third qualifier

Fourth qualifier

Fifth qualifier

Sixth qualifier

Seventh qualifier

References

External links
Draw
Qualifying draw
ITF tournament profile

Singles